Kathryn Elizabeth Hare (born 1959) is a Canadian mathematician specializing in harmonic analysis and fractal geometry. She was the Chair of the Pure Mathematics Department at the University of Waterloo from 2014 to 2018.  She retired from the University of Waterloo in 2021.

Education and career
Hare did her undergraduate studies at the University of Waterloo, graduating in 1981. She earned a Ph.D. from the University of British Columbia in 1986. Her dissertation, under the supervision of John J. F. Fournier, was Thin Sets and Strict-Two-Associatedness, and concerned group representation theory.

She was an assistant professor at the University of Alberta from 1986 to 1988, before she moved back to Waterloo.

Awards and recognition

In 2011, the Chalmers University of Technology awarded her an Honorary Doctorate for her "prominent research, both in extent and depth, within classical and abstract harmonic analysis". In 2020 she was named as a Fellow of the Canadian Mathematical Society.

Selected publications
.
.
.

References

20th-century Canadian mathematicians
21st-century Canadian mathematicians
Mathematical analysts
University of Waterloo alumni
University of British Columbia alumni
Academic staff of the University of Waterloo
1959 births
Living people
20th-century women mathematicians
21st-century women mathematicians
Fellows of the Canadian Mathematical Society